George Tyrell Thorne (6 January 1856 – 24 July 1922) was an English singer and actor, best known for his performances in the comic baritone roles of the Savoy Operas with the D'Oyly Carte Opera Company, especially on tour and in the original New York City productions.  He married D'Oyly Carte chorister Geraldine Thompson.

Life and career
Thorne was born in Chertsey, Surrey, England.  His father was Richard Samuel Thorne, who managed the Surrey Theatre.  His elder brother, Thomas Thorne, was an actor and theatre manager, best known as a founding manager of London's Vaudeville Theatre. His nephew was the actor Frank Gillmore, and his great-nieces were the actresses Ruth Gillmore and Margalo Gillmore.

Early career
Thorne began his stage career at the age of two, when he was carried on at the Theatre Royal, Margate, in the burlesque Medea.  Early engagements followed with his sister, Sarah Thorne's, company, (1870–73); John Coleman's stock company in Leeds (1873); the Covent Garden pantomime (1874–75); and at the Corinthian Theatre, Calcutta, where he reportedly played 104 parts in six months in 1876.

D'Oyly Carte years

Thorne joined a D'Oyly Carte touring company in 1881, playing Captain Felix Flapper in Billee Taylor.  Later in 1881, back in England, he toured as Reginald Bunthorne in Patience.  In 1882–83, he toured as Blood-red Bill in Edward Solomon and Henry Pottinger Stephens's Claude Duval and then as Bunthorne.  In 1883, Thorne married actress Beatrice Thomas, who toured with Thorne as a chorister in the D'Oyly Carte Opera Company under the stage name Geraldine Thompson. In 1884, Thorne appeared as Sir Joseph Porter in H.M.S. Pinafore, Major General Stanley in The Pirates of Penzance, and Bunthorne, with a D'Oyly Carte touring company, adding the roles of Lord Chancellor in Iolanthe and Ko-Ko in The Mikado in 1885.

In 1885, Thorne traveled to New York to present The Mikado at the Fifth Avenue Theatre, where the company played until 1886.  This production also included Geraldine Ulmar as Yum-Yum, Courtice Pounds as Nanki-Poo, and Fred Billington as Pooh-Bah.  While in New York, Arthur Sullivan wrote a special comic orchestration for Thorne (stressing the bassoon part) as an encore to "The Flowers that Bloom in the Spring" (preserved in Sullivan's autograph score), performed in pantomime.  Later, other D'Oyly Carte artists performed a pantomime encore.

Returning from America in 1886, Thorne toured the British provinces and Europe as Sir Joseph and Ko-Ko until 1887.  He then returned to England to rehearse the new opera, Ruddigore.  He gave two matinee performances as Robin Oakapple at the Savoy Theatre and then traveled to New York again to play Robin there with substantially the same troupe that had played in The Mikado in New York in 1885–86.  From 1887 to 1890 (with a break in late 1889 to early 1890, when he contracted typhoid fever), he toured playing Bunthorne, Ko-Ko, Sir Joseph, and later the Major General and Jack Point in The Yeomen of the Guard.  Thorne originated the tragic ending for that character, which was later adopted by most portrayers of the role.  He said that Point was his favourite of the roles.

From 1890 to 1896, Thorne was the principal comedian with a D'Oyly Carte touring company, playing John Wellington Wells in The Sorcerer, Sir Joseph, the Major General, Bunthorne, the Lord Chancellor, King Gama in Princess Ida, Ko-Ko, Jack Point, and the Duke of Plaza-Toro in The Gondoliers.  He also played Bumbo in The Nautch Girl (1892). From 1896 to 1897, he was on the first D'Oyly Carte tour of South Africa, playing his usual roles, as well as Scaphio in Utopia Limited and Rudolph in The Grand Duke.  He then toured in Britain in 1898 to 1899. Thorne says, in his memoir Jots (1897), that he had occasions to play the Judge in Trial by Jury, which would mean that he played the leading comic role in all 13 extant Gilbert and Sullivan operas, but he doesn't say when or where.

Thorne died in Edlesborough, Bedfordshire at the age of 66. He is buried at Kensal Green Cemetery, London.

Playwright and author
Thorne wrote several pantomimes, some burlesques, two comic operas, and adaptations of several of Charles Dickens's novels for the stage.  He also wrote a volume of reminiscences, entitled Jots (1897).

Film
Thorne appeared in Tit Willow (1907) British (B&W), a short film directed by John Morland.  It was distributed by Walturdaw Company in standard 35mm spherical 1.37:1 format, using the Cinematophone Sound-on-disc sound system (synchronized phonograph recording; Phonoscène).

Notes

References
  Introduction by Martyn Green.
 Jones, Brian (2005). Lytton, Gilbert and Sullivan's Jester. London: Trafford Publishing.

External links
 
 1895 review of Thorne's Lord Chancellor
 Short film of "Tit Willow"

1856 births
1922 deaths
People from Chertsey
Burials at Kensal Green Cemetery
English opera singers
19th-century English singers